Ronald Mayorga Sánchez (born 26 June 1984, Yumbo, Valle del Cauca, Colombia) is a Colombian journalist and TV anchor of  on Caracol Television in Colombia. He works as a radio journalist who works with "Blue Radio", one of the radio stations imported from Latin America as a host in Vox Populi.

Early life 
Mayorga decided on journalism as a youth. In 2006, he graduated with honors in "La Universidad del Valle" and received the award for "Best Student of the Faculty of Arts".

Career 
He was part of El Tiempo, the number one newspaper in Colombia. He served as Communications Director of News Reporting for the Municipality of Yumbo Caracol.

Ronald Mayorga now shares his time between television's , the radio Blue and his foundation "The Valley of Our Dreams", which began work in 2011 with four friends to help children of Valle del Cauca.

This year, "The Valley of Our Dreams" work to give shoes to children and achieved the goal of thousand pairs of shoes to the community. They also help build homes and share fun times with kids.

  (2011-2015)
 Caracol TV, Caracol Noticias (2004-2008) Debut
 E! (2013)

Recognition

References

External links

People from Valle del Cauca Department
Colombian journalists
Male journalists
Colombian television presenters
1984 births
Living people